The 2010–11 Turkish Airlines Euroleague was the 11th season of the modern era of professional Euroleague Basketball, and the first under the title sponsorship of Turkish Airlines. Including the competition's previous incarnation as the FIBA Europe Champions Cup, this was the 54th season of the premier first-tier competition for European men's clubs.

The format featured 24 teams, beginning with Game 1 of the first qualifying round on September 21, 2010, and culminating at the Final Four in the Palau Sant Jordi, Barcelona. It was won by the Athenian club Panathinaikos (6th title), who defeated Maccabi Electra in the championship game of May 8, 2011. Montepaschi Siena, finished 3rd by holding off Real Madrid in the third-place game.

At the individual level, the season was marked by Dimitris Diamantidis of Panathinaikos. Not only did the Greek point guard lift the trophy for the third time in five years and receive the Euroleague Final Four MVP award, but he also became the first player ever to win three end-of-season awards: Euroleague MVP, Euroleague Best Defender, and All-Euroleague First Team.

Teams 

†As winner of the ULEB Eurocup 2009–10

Draw 
The draws for the 2010–11 Turkish Airlines Euroleague was held on Thursday, July 8 at Barcelona, Spain. The draws began at 11:15 local time (CET) and determined the qualifying-round matchups and regular-season groups for the Euroleague, as well as the qualifying rounds for the Eurocup and the regular-season for the EuroChallenge.

Teams were organised into six pots of four teams.

Two teams from the same country cannot coincide in the same Regular Season group, except for Spain that has five teams participating in the competition.

Qualifying rounds 

The Qualifying Rounds consisted of three rounds, QR1, QR2 and QR3. The rounds were played in home and away series.

Regular season 
The Regular Season began on 18 October 2010 with Olympiacos hosting Real Madrid and ended on 23 December 2010.

If teams were level on record at the end of the Regular Season, tiebreakers are applied in the following order:
 Head-to-head record.
 Head-to-head point differential.
 Point differential during the Regular Season.
 Points scored during the regular season.
 Sum of quotients of points scored and points allowed in each Regular Season match.

Top 16 
The 16 qualified teams were drawn into four groups with four teams. The matches were played between January 19 and March 3, the top two teams of every group advanced to the playoffs. The draw took place on 4 January 2011 at Barcelona at 13:00 CET, and was streamed live on the Euroleague's official website.

Quarterfinals 

Team 1 hosted Games 1 and 2, plus Game 5 if necessary. Team 2 hosted Game 3, and Game 4 if necessary.

Final four

Individual statistics

Rating

Points

Rebounds

Assists

Other Stats

Game highs

Awards

Euroleague 2010–11 MVP 
  Dimitris Diamantidis (  Panathinaikos)

Euroleague 2010–11 Final Four MVP 
  Dimitris Diamantidis (  Panathinaikos)

All-Euroleague Team 2010–11

Top Scorer (Alphonso Ford Trophy) 
  Igor Rakočević (  Efes Pilsen)

Best Defender 
  Dimitris Diamantidis (  Panathinaikos)

Rising Star 
  Nikola Mirotić (  Real Madrid)

Coach of the Year (Alexander Gomelsky Award) 
  Željko Obradović (  Panathinaikos)

Club Executive of the Year 
  Pavlos Giannakopoulos and Thanasis Giannakopoulos (  Panathinaikos)

MVP Weekly

Regular season

Top 16

Quarterfinals

MVP of Month

References and notes

External links 
 Euroleague.net Official Site
 Eurobasket.com Euroleague Page

 
EuroLeague seasons